Siphlonurus alternatus is a species of primitive minnow mayfly in the family Siphlonuridae. It is found in North America, Europe. In North America its range includes all of Canada, the northeastern United States, and Alaska.

References

Siphlonuridae
Articles created by Qbugbot
Insects described in 1824